Ernesto Ruiz Velasco de Lira (born 27 August 1969) is a Mexican politician affiliated with the National Action Party. As of 2014 he served as Deputy of the LX Legislature of the Mexican Congress representing Aguascalientes.

References

1969 births
Living people
People from Aguascalientes City
Members of the Chamber of Deputies (Mexico)
National Action Party (Mexico) politicians
21st-century Mexican politicians
Politicians from Aguascalientes
Members of the Congress of Aguascalientes
Autonomous University of Aguascalientes alumni